Halvdan Holbø (4 May 1907 in Vågå, Oppland – 21 September 1995) was a Norwegian painter.

He was born in Vågå as a son of Kristen Holbø. He studied under Søren Onsager, Anders C. Svarstad, Halfdan Strøm and Jean Heiberg, and spent time in Paris. He is represented with five landscape paintings in the National Gallery of Norway.

References

1907 births
1995 deaths
People from Vågå
20th-century Norwegian painters
Norwegian male painters
20th-century Norwegian male artists